Liang Jinhu (born 18 January 1997) is a Chinese footballer who currently plays for Nanjing Shaye in the China League Two.

Club career
Liang Jinhu was promoted to Chinese Super League side Jiangsu Suning's first team squad by Fabio Capello in 2018. On 8 July 2018, he made his senior debut in a 0–0 home draw against Guangzhou R&F, replacing Ji Xiang in the stoppage time. He made his league debut on 5 August 2018 in a 3–1 home win over Guizhou Hengfeng, also came from substitution in the stoppage time for Wu Xi.
In February 2019, Liang was loaned to League Two newcomer Nanjing Shaye for the 2019 season.

Career statistics
.

References

External links
 

1997 births
Living people
Chinese footballers
Sportspeople from Nanjing
Footballers from Jiangsu
Jiangsu F.C. players
Chinese Super League players
China League Two players
Association football defenders
China international footballers